Ruth Scott may refer to:

 Ruth Scott (broadcaster), broadcaster on RTÉ 2fm
 Ruth Jury Scott (1909–2003), environmental activist, naturalist, and conservationist